Peter James Edward Oldring (born August 25, 1971) is a Canadian actor and comedian.

Early life 
Oldring was born on August 25, 1971, in Drayton Valley, Alberta. He graduated from Sir Winston Churchill High School in 1989 in Calgary, Alberta, and studied at the National Theatre School of Canada.

Career 
In addition to performing with The Second City improv group in Toronto and Los Angeles, Oldring has appeared on Canadian television. He was also a regular cast member of the redneck-themed sketch comedy series Blue Collar TV. Feature film roles include K-19: The Widowmaker, Focus and Lost and Delirious. He has a starring role in Intern Academy. He also played Farrah Fawcett's gay assistant in the television film Hollywood Wives. Oldring also appeared in the series Doc and The WB's D.C., as well as in the television movie The Ricky Nelson Story. Oldring voiced Cody, Ezekiel and Tyler in Total Drama. Oldring also starred in the 2007 film Young People Fucking. In 2011, he was cast as "Lonnie" in the Disney XD show Kickin' It. He had a supporting role in two episodes of Psych: Extradition: British Columbia and Extradition II: The Actual Extradition Part.

His voice acting credits include the animated children's show Braceface, Mischief City, Miss Spider's Sunny Patch Kids, My Friend Rabbit, Pelswick, Total Drama, 6teen, Pecola  and Glenn Martin, DDS. Oldring has also voicing video game characters, such as Alfred Ashford in Resident Evil – Code: Veronica.

Oldring has also worked on numerous projects with his longtime creative partner Pat Kelly, including The Comedy Network series Good Morning World and the CBC Radio comedy show This Is That. Oldring appeared on the TV One original series Love That Girl! as a gay hairdresser named Fabian.

In 2017, Oldring appeared in an episode of the Netflix series House of Cards as a Congressman from Florida.

Alongside Paul O'Sullivan, Debra McGrath, Lisa Merchant and Rebecca Northan, he received a Gemini Award nomination for Ensemble Performance in a Comedy Program or Series at the 19th Gemini Awards in 2004 for The Joe Blow Show.

Personal life 
Peter has been married to American actress Sara Erikson since March 2010.

Filmography

Film

Television

Video games

Awards and nominations 
 2004 – Gemini Award for Best Ensemble Performance in a Comedy Program or Series – Nominated
 2008 – Gemini Award for Best Performance or Host in a Variety Program or Series – Nominated
 2009 – Canadian Comedy Award for Best Male Performance – Won
 2017 – ACTRA Award for Outstanding Performance – Voice (shared with Pat Kelly) – Nominated
 2018 – Canadian Screen Award for Best Actor in a Web Program or Series, This Is That – Won

References

External links 
 
 Good Morning World
https://www.peteroldring.com/

1971 births
Living people
20th-century Canadian male actors
21st-century Canadian male actors
Canadian Comedy Award winners
Canadian expatriate male actors in the United States
Canadian male comedians
Canadian male film actors
Canadian male television actors
Canadian male video game actors
Canadian male voice actors
Canadian satirists
Canadian Screen Award winners
Canadian sketch comedians
CBC Radio hosts
Comedians from Alberta
Male actors from Alberta